FFWD is an eponymous album by FFWD - Robert Fripp, Thomas Fehlmann, Kris Weston, and Dr. Alex Paterson.

The title is also a play on the abbreviation often used on the fast forward control of a tape deck or CD player, also referenced in the "double-arrow" graphic used on the cover.

The album peaked at #48 in the UK Albums Chart in August 1994.

Production
Fripp was recorded for hours improvising on his guitar; Paterson constructed these improvisations into working parts for the album.

Critical reception
Trouser Press wrote that "the modular systems-sounds of FFWD are neither danceable nor dreamable."

Track listing
"Hidden" – 7:16
"Lucky Saddle – 6:40
"Drone" – 1:01
"Hempire" – 3:12
"Collossus" – 5:38
"What Time Is Clock" – 1:15
"Can of Bliss" – 3:15
"Elevenses" – 0:49
"Meteor Storm" – 4:25
"Buckwheat & Grits" – 10:51
"Klangtest" – 5:01
"Suess Wie Eine Nuss" – 8:20

References

External links

FFWD albums
1994 albums
The Orb